3Pillar Global, Inc. is a product lifecycle management and software product development company based in Virginia, United States.

History 
3Pillar Global was founded in 2006 as Three Pillar Global, Inc by David H. DeWolf, who continues to remain the CEO. It is headquartered in Fairfax, Virginia and has offices in Timișoara, Iasi, Cluj-Napoca in Romania; and Noida, India.

Services 
The company offers services in 8 core areas: product strategy, product management, UI and UX, product architecture, product engineering, quality assurance and testing, product operations, and project management.

Sectors served by the company include media and entertainment, financial services, information services, and the health and wellness industry. Notable clients include PBS, CARFAX, and Equinox Group. The company has more than 1500 employees worldwide.

Acquisitions 
In August 2020, 3Pillar Global announced the acquisition of Costa Rica-based software development company Isthmus Software.

In December 2020, 3Pillar Global announced the acquisition of Tempe Arizona-based software development company Tiempo Development.

References

Software companies based in Virginia
Software companies established in 2006
Companies based in Fairfax, Virginia
2006 establishments in Virginia